Massachusetts House of Representatives' 13th Middlesex district in the United States is one of 160 legislative districts included in the lower house of the Massachusetts General Court. It covers part of Middlesex County. Democrat Carmine Gentile of Sudbury has represented the district since 2015.

Locales represented
The district includes the following localities:
 part of Framingham
 part of Marlborough
 Sudbury
 Precincts 1, 2, and 3 of Wayland

The current district geographic boundary overlaps with those of the Massachusetts Senate's 2nd Middlesex and Norfolk district, 3rd Middlesex district,  Middlesex and Worcester district, and Norfolk, Bristol and Middlesex district.

Former locale
The district previously covered Natick, circa 1872.

Representatives
 Albert Wood, circa 1858 
 William F. Ellis, circa 1859 
 Charles Francis Woodward, circa 1888 
 Benjamin Loring Young, circa 1920 
 David B. Williams, circa 1951 
 Richard M. McGrath, circa 1975 
 Lucile P. Hicks, 1981-1990
 Susan Pope
 Thomas P. Conroy
 Carmine Lawrence Gentile, 2015-current

See also
 List of Massachusetts House of Representatives elections
 List of Massachusetts General Courts
 List of former districts of the Massachusetts House of Representatives
 Other Middlesex County districts of the Massachusetts House of Representatives: 1st, 2nd, 3rd, 4th, 5th, 6th, 7th, 8th, 9th, 10th, 11th, 12th, 14th, 15th, 16th, 17th, 18th, 19th, 20th, 21st, 22nd, 23rd, 24th, 25th, 26th, 27th, 28th, 29th, 30th, 31st, 32nd, 33rd, 34th, 35th, 36th, 37th

Images
Portraits of legislators

References

External links
 Ballotpedia
  (State House district information based on U.S. Census Bureau's American Community Survey).
 League of Women Voters of Framingham
 League of Women Voters of Sudbury

House
Government of Middlesex County, Massachusetts